Ann Carolyn Telnaes (born 1960) is an American editorial cartoonist.  She creates editorial cartoons in various media—animation, visual essays, live sketches, and traditional print—for the Washington Post. She also contributes to The Nib.

In 2001, Telnaes became the second female cartoonist and one of the few freelancers to win the Pulitzer Prize for Editorial Cartooning. In 2017, she received the Reuben Award, and thus became the first woman to have received both the Reuben Award and the Pulitzer Prize for Editorial Cartooning.

Biography 
Telnaes earned her B.F.A. at the California Institute of the Arts in 1985, specializing in character animation. In 2020 she taught the course "Commentary Though Cartoons" as a visiting faculty member at CalArts.

Before becoming an editorial cartoonist, she worked for some years in the animation field and also as a show designer for Walt Disney Imagineering. She contributed to such films as The Brave Little Toaster and The Chipmunk Adventure.

In 2003, while the U.S. Supreme Court was deciding the fate of same sex marriage, Telnaes stepped into the fray by creating the editorial cartoon poking fun at the historical balance of gender roles in the United States. "However, Telnaes wryly observed that the traditional view of marriage between a man and a woman has resulted in second class citizenship for many people in America for a long time."

Telnaes had a solo exhibition at the Great Hall in the Thomas Jefferson Building in 2004.

In 2015 a Telnaes cartoon was removed by the Washington Post from the newspaper's website. The cartoon had depicted Ted Cruz as an organ grinder with two monkeys. Telnaes defended her cartoon by tweeting, "Ted Cruz has put his children in a political ad—don't start screaming when editorial cartoonists draw them as well."

In 2016–2017 Telnaes was president of the Association of American Editorial Cartoonists.

In 2020 her work was included in the exhibit Women in Comics: Looking Forward, Looking Back at the Society of Illustrators in New York City.

Personal life 
Ann Telnaes was born in Stockholm, Sweden, in 1960. She graduated from Reno High School, Reno, Nevada in 1979.
Telnaes lives in Washington, D.C.

Awards 
 1996
 Best Cartoonist, The Population Institute XVII Global Media Awards
 Best Editorial Cartoonist, Sixth Annual Environmental Media Awards
 (finalist) Reuben Award (National Cartoonists Society)
 1997 — National Headliner Award for Editorial Cartoons 
 2001 — Pulitzer Prize for Editorial Cartooning
 2002 — Maggie Award (Planned Parenthood), for Editorial Cartoons
 2003 — Clifford K. and James T. Berryman Award (National Press Foundation)
 2011 (finalist) — Herblock Prize
 2016 (awarded in 2017) Reuben Award (National Cartoonists Society)

 2023 — Herblock Prize

Bibliography 
 Humor's Edge (Pomegranate Press/Library of Congress, 2004)
 Dick: An Editorial Cartoon Collection (Ann Telnaes, 2006)
 Trump's ABC (Fantagraphics, 2018)

References

External links

 
 Library of Congress, Humor's Edge: Cartoons by Ann Telnaes
 Ann Telnaes animations at The Washington Post
 

American animators
American editorial cartoonists
Pulitzer Prize for Editorial Cartooning winners
1960 births
Living people
American women animators
Artists from Stockholm
Swedish emigrants to the United States
California Institute of the Arts alumni
American women cartoonists
21st-century American women